Ridsdalea eucodon (synonym Rothmannia eucodon) is a species of plant in the family Rubiaceae found in Indo-China. Its name in Vietnamese is găng cơm or găng cao.

References

External links
 Picture on VN Creatures: hoa chuông núi

Gardenieae
Flora of Indo-China